Watlington railway station in Oxfordshire was the terminus of the Watlington and Princes Risborough Railway and opened in 1872.  Watlington station was not in Watlington itself, but in the parish of Pyrton half a mile from Watlington.

The line was always single track. The facilities at Watlington station included a stone-built passenger building, a goods shed, and locomotive and carriage sheds.

The line was projected to be extended to Wallingford, where it would complete a cross-country line between Cholsey and Princes Risborough. Due to financial difficulties the Watlington - Wallingford section was never built.

British Railways closed the Watlington and Princes Risborough Railway to passengers in 1957 and to goods in 1961. Remains of the buildings exist, heavily overgrown, on private land.

See also 
 List of closed railway stations in Britain

References

Bibliography

External links 
 Station on Disused Stations

Disused railway stations in Oxfordshire
Former Great Western Railway stations
Railway stations in Great Britain opened in 1872
Railway stations in Great Britain closed in 1957
1872 establishments in England
1957 disestablishments in England
Watlington, Oxfordshire